Damson Idris (born 2 September 1991) is a British-Nigerian actor. He currently stars on John Singleton's crime drama Snowfall, which debuted 5 July 2017 on FX. He played the co-lead in Netflix's sci-fi action film Outside the Wire (2021).

Early life and education
Idris was born in Peckham, South-East London to Nigerian parents, and he is of Yoruba Nigerian descent. He is the youngest of six children. He played football and dreamed of being the next Cristiano Ronaldo. He also played rugby, and in 2002, he shook the hand of Queen Elizabeth II when his team took part in her Golden Jubilee. Idris's elder siblings—three brothers and two sisters—have all gone on to corporate careers in law, business, and IT. He ended up studying drama at Brunel University London. He received a BA Honours degree in Theatre, Film & Television studies. He then continued his training at Identity School of Acting in London alongside the likes of John Boyega, Letitia Wright, and Malachi Kirby.

Career
At Brunel, Idris met actress Cathy Tyson, who encouraged him to meet Ade Solanke and audition for a part in her play, Pandora's Box. He got the role, signed with an agent and began performing in more plays. He also trained at the Identity School of Acting, founded by Femi Oguns. After performing at the Royal National Theatre in London, Idris decided to pursue television and film roles. He had several parts on British series including Miranda (2013), Doctors (2015) and Casualty (2015).

Idris's breakout role is Franklin Saint, an ambitious 19-year-old drug dealer in Los Angeles, in the FX crime drama Snowfall from John Singleton, which debuted in July 2017. The first season of Snowfall — set in 1983 as the United States is on the verge of the crack cocaine epidemic — weaves together the stories of several characters whose lives will soon collide because of drugs. Idris auditioned through video in London before flying out to Los Angeles, where he spent the day with Singleton, who wanted to ensure Idris had mastery of the accent. To practise his American accent he worked with rapper WC, who tutored him on not just an authentic accent but the mannerisms specific to South Central Los Angeles. Idris earned strong reviews for his performance; Malcolm Venable of TV Guide called him "nothing short of captivating." The second series of Snowfall, set in 1984, premiered in July 2018.

Idris had his first big screen part in 2016 in the British thriller City of Tiny Lights, starring Riz Ahmed. In 2017, he made his American film debut in Megan Leavey alongside Kate Mara, who plays the title character in the eponymous war film. Idris also has a part as an FBI agent in the 2018 film The Commuter with Liam Neeson; and starred in Farming, alongside Kate Beckinsale. Farming is a semi-autobiographical story of Nigerian-British actor Adewale Akinnuoye-Agbaje, who directed the film. Idris plays the character based on Akinnuoye-Agbaje, who, like many Nigerian people in the late 20th century, was "farmed out" to a white family in the UK in the hopes of a better life, while Beckinsale portrays his strict foster mother. In 2019, Damson won the Award for Best Actor in a British Film at the Edinburgh Film Festival for his portrayal. He also appears in "Smithereens," the second episode of the fifth season of the anthology series Black Mirror.

In May 2017, Idris won the "Emerging Talent Award" at the 12th Screen Nation Film and Television Awards in London.

Personal life
Idris is a devoted football fan and supports Manchester United F.C. He said his hero is American actor Denzel Washington. In 2017, he told Interview magazine, "[Denzel is] phenomenal. I didn't know I wanted to be an actor, but once it found me I looked at whom people were saying were great. I looked at who I wanted to be like. Not just in acting, but in their personal life as well. Being a well-rounded person, a fine example of good taste and prestige and class, that's what I really chased, so he was the person that did it for me."

Idris is currently dating Lori Harvey, on January 13, 2023 he shared romantic photos of himself and Lori via his Instagram story confirming that they are in a relationship.

Filmography

Film

Television

Theatre

References

External links 

1991 births
Living people
People from Peckham
English people of Nigerian descent
English male film actors
English male television actors
British male voice actors
Black British male actors
21st-century English male actors
Alumni of Brunel University London
British male stage actors